Southern Air Charter is an airline and air charter company, operating in the Bahamas. They mainly fly air charters, but the airline does offer some scheduled inter-island services between destinations in the Bahamas.

Fleet 
 Beechcraft 1900D - 2 19 passenger capacity
 Beechcraft 1900C

The Beechcraft 1900C is the current flagship of Southern Air Charter.

Services 

In addition to charter services, Southern Air Charter flies scheduled flights between Nassau, Bahamas and the following destinations:
Stella Maris Long Island, Bahamas
Deadman's Cay, Long Island; Bahamas
North Eleuthera, Eleuthera, Bahamas. 
Governor's Harbor, Eleuthera, Bahamas.
Arthur's Town, Cat Island; Bahamas

Charter services to the following international destinations are also flown:
Cuba (Ciego de Avila, Havana, Varadero)
Haiti (Cap-Haïtien, Port-au-Prince)
Dominican Republic (La Romana, Puerto Plata)
Turks & Caicos (Grand Turk, Providenciales, North Caicos & South Caicos)

Livery 

White fuselage overall and the company logo on the tail.

In 2013 Southern Air rolled out a new White livery with a gold dove on its tail, on the 2 Beech 1900C aircraft.

Accidents 

On October 22, 2004 a Southern Air Charter Beechcraft 1900C ran out of fuel and crash-landed in the water off South Beach, New Providence on its way to Nassau. No one was hurt.

On September 30, 2016, a Southern Air Charter Beechcraft 1900C N376SA crashed at Deadman's Cay Airport. The aircraft attempted a landing with gear up.

References

External links
Southern Air Charter Official Website
 Twitter
 Facebook

Airlines of the Bahamas
Airlines established in 1998